The women's 78 kg competition at the 2020 European Judo Championships was held on 21 November at the O2 Arena.

Results

Repechage

Main bracket

References

External links
 

W78
European Judo Championships Women's Half Heavyweight
European W78